Tom Cousineau Nelson (May 1, 1917 – September 24, 1973) was a Major League Baseball infielder who played for the Boston Braves in 1945.  The 28-year-old rookie was a native of Chicago.

Nelson is one of many ballplayers who only appeared in the major leagues during World War II.  He made his major league debut on April 17, 1945 (Opening Day), against the New York Giants at Braves Field. In 40 games he hit .165 (20-for-121) with 6 runs batted in and 6 runs scored, and his fielding percentage in 114 total chances was .904.

He died in 1973 in San Diego, California.

External links 
Baseball Reference
Retrosheet

Major League Baseball second basemen
Major League Baseball third basemen
Boston Braves players
Birmingham Barons players
Columbus Red Birds players
Macon Peaches players
Medford Rogues players
Milwaukee Brewers (minor league) players
Moline Plowboys players
Muskogee Reds players
Oklahoma City Indians players
Pensacola Pilots players
Sacramento Solons players
Salina Millers players
Spokane Indians players
Visalia Cubs players
1917 births
1973 deaths
Baseball players from Chicago